Walter William Rouse Ball (14 August 1850 – 4 April 1925), known as W. W. Rouse Ball, was a British mathematician, lawyer, and fellow at Trinity College, Cambridge, from 1878 to 1905. He was also a keen amateur magician, and the founding president of the Cambridge Pentacle Club in 1919, one of the world's oldest magic societies.

Life
Born 14 August 1850 in Hampstead, London, Ball was the son and heir of Walter Frederick Ball, of 3, St John's Park Villas, South Hampstead, London. Educated at University College School, he entered Trinity College, Cambridge, in 1870, became a scholar and first Smith's Prizeman, and gained his BA in 1874 as second Wrangler. He became a Fellow of Trinity in 1875, and remained one for the rest of his life.

He died on 4 April 1925 in Elmside, Cambridge, and is buried at the Parish of the Ascension Burial Ground in Cambridge.

He is commemorated in the naming of the small pavilion, now used as changing rooms and toilets, on Jesus Green in Cambridge.

Books
A History of the Study of Mathematics at Cambridge; Cambridge University Press, 1889 (reissued by the publisher, 2009)
 (1st ed. 1888 and later editions). Dover 1960 republication of fourth edition: .
 (1st ed. 1892; later editions with H.S.M. Coxeter)<ref>{{cite journal|author=Frame, J. S.|title=Review: Mathematical Recreations and Essays, 11th edition, by W. W. Rouse Ball; revised by H. S. M. Coxeter|journal=Bull. Amer. Math. Soc.|year=1940|volume=45|issue=3|pages=211–213|url=http://www.ams.org/journals/bull/1940-46-03/S0002-9904-1940-07170-8/S0002-9904-1940-07170-8.pdf|doi=10.1090/S0002-9904-1940-07170-8}}</ref>A History of the First Trinity Boat Club (1908)
 (1st ed. 1918). Macmillan and Co., Limited 1918: .String Figures; Cambridge, W. Heffer & Sons (1st ed. 1920, 2nd ed. 1921, 3rd ed. 1929, reprinted with supplements as Fun with String Figures'' by Dover Publications, 1971)

See also
Martin Gardner – another author of recreational mathematics
Rouse Ball Professor of English Law
Rouse Ball Professor of Mathematics

Notes

References

External links

 
 
 
 
 
 

1850 births
1925 deaths
19th-century English mathematicians
20th-century English mathematicians
British historians of mathematics
Recreational mathematicians
Mathematics popularizers
Alumni of University College London
Alumni of Trinity College, Cambridge
Fellows of Trinity College, Cambridge
Magic squares
People educated at University College School
Second Wranglers
British magicians